The Central Bank of Seychelles (Seychellois Creole: Labank santral Sesel), is the central bank of Seychelles. It was officially established on 1 January 1983, with the dissolution of its precursor, the Seychelles Monetary Authority.

Location

The offices of the bank are housed in the Central Bank Building on Independence Avenue in Victoria, the capital city of Seychelles. The three-storey building is fully air-conditioned and has  of office and storage space.

History
In 1974, the Currency Commission of the Seychelles was formed. In 1978, the Seychelles Monetary Authority was established, which in 1983 was transformed into the Central Bank of Seychelles (CBS). Up until 1982, the accounts of the Government of Seychelles were managed by Barclays Bank International. On 29 December 1982 that responsibility was transferred to CBS by passing the "Central Bank of Seychelles Act 1982". An amended "Central Bank of Seychelles Act 2004" provided for the autonomy of the bank within the Seychellois government structure.

Governance
The affairs of the bank are supervised by an eight-person board of directors, chaired by the bank governor. As of April 2020, the following eight individuals comprised the board.

 Caroline Abel: Governor and Chairperson
 Christopher Edmond: First Deputy Governor
 Jenifer Sullivan: Second Deputy Governor
 Errol Dias: Director
 Bertrand Rassool: Director
 William Otiende Ogara: Director
 Frank Ally: Attorney General, Director
 Sherley Marie: Director.

Governors

The table below illustrates the names of the various Governors of the Central Bank of Seychelles, from its inception, on 1 January 1983.

See also

 Economy of the Seychelles
 List of banks in Seychelles
 List of central banks of Africa
 List of central banks

References

External links
Central Bank of Seychelles
SWFI Profile

Economy of Seychelles
Seychelles
1983 establishments in Seychelles
Banks established in 1983
Banks of Seychelles